Lytton is an unincorporated community in Fulton County, in the U.S. state of Ohio.

History
A post office called Lyton was established in 1893, and remained in operation until 1903. Lytton also had a country store.

References

Unincorporated communities in Fulton County, Ohio
Unincorporated communities in Ohio